Pseudoenzymes are variants of enzymes (usually proteins) that are catalytically-deficient (usually inactive), meaning that they perform little or no enzyme catalysis.  They are believed to be represented in all major enzyme families in the kingdoms of life, where they have important signaling and metabolic functions, many of which are only now coming to light. Pseudoenzymes are becoming increasingly important to analyse, especially as the bioinformatic analysis of genomes reveals their ubiquity. Their important regulatory and sometimes disease-associated functions in metabolic and signalling pathways are also shedding new light on the non-catalytic functions of active enzymes, of moonlighting proteins, the re-purposing of proteins in distinct cellular roles (Protein moonlighting). They are also suggesting new ways to target and interpret cellular signalling mechanisms using small molecules and drugs. The most intensively analyzed, and certainly the best understood pseudoenzymes in terms of cellular signalling functions are probably the pseudokinases, the pseudoproteases and the pseudophosphatases. Recently, the pseudo-deubiquitylases have also begun to gain prominence.

Structures and roles
The difference between enzymatically active and inactive homologues has been noted (and in some cases, understood when comparing catalytically active and inactive proteins residing in recognisable families) for some time at the sequence level, and some pseudoenzymes have also been referred to as 'prozymes' when they were analysed in protozoan parasites. The best studied pseudoenzymes reside amongst various key signalling superfamilies of enzymes, such as the proteases, the protein kinases, protein phosphatases and ubiquitin modifying enzymes. The role of pseudoenzymes as "pseudo scaffolds" has also been recognised  and pseudoenzymes are now beginning to be more thoroughly studied in terms of their biology and function, in large part because they are also interesting potential targets (or anti-targets) for drug design in the context of intracellular cellular signalling complexes.

Examples classes

See also 
Kinase
Pseudokinase
Phosphatome
Protein phosphatase

References

External links 
 

Biochemistry
Cell signaling
Cancer